Vladimir "Vlado" Janković (Vladimiros "Vlando" Yankovits, ; born March 3, 1990) is a Greek-Serbian professional basketball player for AEK Athens of the Greek Basket League and the Basketball Champions League. Standing at 2.02 m (6 ft 7  in), he plays as a small forward. He is the son of the late Serbian professional basketball player Boban Janković.

Early life
Janković was born March 3, 1990, in Belgrade, SR Serbia, SFR Yugoslavia. He is the son of the famous late Serbian professional basketball player Boban Janković, who was tragically paralyzed during a Greek Basket League playoff game between Panionios and Panathinaikos in 1993.

Janković moved to Nea Smyrni, Greece with his family at the age of two, when his father, Boban, joined the Greek club Panionios for the 1992–93 season.

Professional career
Janković began his professional career with the Greek Basket League club Panionios in 2007. In 2008, he moved to the Serbian club Mega, on loan from Panionios. He then returned to Panionios in 2009.

On 20 June 2013, Janković joined the Greek club Panathinaikos. He was announced as a new player of Panathinaikos, for the following three years, along with his Panionios teammate Nikos Pappas. During his second season at the club, he switched his jersey number from 16 to 8.

Janković played in the 2016 NBA Summer League, with the Summer League squad of the New Orleans Pelicans.

On August 3, 2016, Janković signed with the Spanish Liga ACB club Valencia. On October 31, 2016, he was loaned to the Greek club Aris Thessaloniki, for the rest of the season. On July 20, 2017, Janković signed with Andorra. 

He spent the entire Greek League 2018–19 season with Holargos, averaging a career-high 13.8 points, 5.4 rebounds and 2.7 assists per game. 

On November 11, 2019, Janković signed a seven-month contract with AEK Athens. He signed a two-year extension with the team on August 3, 2020.

On July 23, 2021, Janković moved back to Thessaloniki for PAOK. In 23 games, he averaged 8 points, 4.9 rebounds and 2.7 assists, playing around 25 minutes per contest. 

On January 20, 2023, Janković  signed back with AEK Athens for the rest of the season.

National team career

Greek junior national team
Janković won the gold medal at the 2008 FIBA Europe Under-18 Championship, while playing with the junior Greek national basketball team. Janković also won the silver medal at the 2009 FIBA Under-19 World Cup and the gold medal at the 2009 FIBA Europe Under-20 Championship. He also won the silver medal at the 2010 FIBA Europe Under-20 Championship with Greece's junior national team.

Greek senior national team
Janković became a member of the senior men's Greek national basketball team in 2013, when he was invited to train with the team during its preparation phase before the EuroBasket 2013.

Personal life
Janković speaks Greek, Serbian, and English fluently. In September 2012, Jankovic began dating former Greek model Elena Papadopoulou and on July 21, 2018 they married in Paros. On September 7, 2019, Papadopoulou gave birth to their first child, a son Maximo Jankovic.

Career statistics

EuroLeague

|-
| style="text-align:left;"| 2013–14
| style="text-align:left;"| Panathinaikos
| 17 || 1 || 3.6 || .250 || .250 || .500 || .6 || .2 || .2 || .1 || .6 || .4
|-
| style="text-align:left;"| 2014–15
| style="text-align:left;"| Panathinaikos
| 27 || 27 || 26.3 || .370 || .333 || .741 || 3.7|| 2.1 || 1.1 || .2 || 8.3 || 8.6
|-
| style="text-align:left;"| 2015–16
| style="text-align:left;"| Panathinaikos
| 22 || 7 || 15.7 || .528 || .400 || .536 || 2.5 || 1.4 || .5 || .1 || 5.7 || 6.2
|- class="sortbottom"
| style="text-align:left;"| Career
| style="text-align:left;"|
| 66 || 35 || 16.9 || .412 || .347 || .663 || 2.5 || 1.4 || .7 || .1 || 5.4 || 5.7

Awards and accomplishments

Pro career
Greek League All-Star: (2013)
Greek League Most Improved Player: (2013)
Greek League Best Five: (2013)
3× Greek Cup Winner: (2014, 2015, 2016)
Greek League Champion: (2014)
Basketball Champions League runner up : (2020)

References

External links
Euroleague.net Profile
FIBA Champions League Profile
FIBA Archive Profile
Eurobasket.com Profile
Greek Basket League Profile 
Greek Basket League Profile 
Hellenic Basketball Federation Profile 
Spanish League Profile 
Draftexpress.com Profile
Twitter

1990 births
Living people
AEK B.C. players
Aris B.C. players
Basketball players from Athens
BC Andorra players
Greek Basket League players
Greek expatriate basketball people in Spain
Greek men's basketball players
Greek people of Serbian descent
Holargos B.C. players
KK Mega Basket players
Liga ACB players
Panathinaikos B.C. players
Panionios B.C. players
P.A.O.K. BC players
Serbian expatriate basketball people in Andorra
Serbian expatriate basketball people in Greece
Serbian expatriate basketball people in Spain
Serbian emigrants to Greece
Serbian men's basketball players
Small forwards
Basketball players from Belgrade
Valencia Basket players